The parish of Saint George ("St. George") is located in the interior of Barbados.  It is one of two land-locked parishes, the other being Saint Thomas to the north.  A prominent landmark in the parish is Gun Hill Signal Station – one of the few remaining signal stations, dating back to 1818.

Saint George borders six of the eleven other parishes, more than any other parish.

Geography

Populated places
The parish contains the following towns, villages, localities, settlements, communities and hamlets:

Parishes bordering Saint George
Christ Church – South
Saint John – Northeast
Saint Joseph – North
Saint Michael – West
Saint Philip – East
Saint Thomas – Northwest

References

External links 
 
 

 
Parishes of Barbados